João Vitor may refer to:

 João Vitor (footballer, born 1983), Portuguese football centre-back
 João Vítor (footballer, born 1987), Swiss football defender
 João Vitor (footballer, born 1988), Brazilian football midfielder
 João Vitor (footballer, born 1991), Brazilian football midfielder
 João Vitor (footballer, born 2000), Brazilian footballer
 João Vítor de Oliveira (born 1992), Brazilian hurdler
 João Vitor França (born 1998), Brazilian basketball player